Peroxyacetyl nitrate is a peroxyacyl nitrate.  It is a secondary pollutant present in photochemical smog. It is thermally unstable and decomposes into peroxyethanoyl radicals and nitrogen dioxide gas. It is a lachrymatory substance, meaning that it irritates the lungs and eyes.

Peroxyacetyl nitrate, or PAN, is an oxidant that is more stable than ozone. Hence, it is more capable of long-range transport than ozone. It serves as a carrier for oxides of nitrogen (NOx) into rural regions and causes ozone formation in the global troposphere.

Atmospheric chemistry 
PAN is produced in the atmosphere via photochemical oxidation of hydrocarbons to peroxyacetic acid radicals in the presence of nitrogen dioxide (NO2). Since there are no direct emissions, it is a secondary pollutant. Next to ozone and hydrogen peroxide (H2O2), it is an important component of photochemical smog.

Further peroxyacyl nitrates in the atmosphere are peroxypropionyl nitrate (PPN), peroxybutyryl nitrate (PBN), and peroxybenzoyl nitrate (PBzN). Chlorinated forms have also been observed. PAN is the most important peroxyacyl nitrate. PAN and its homologues reach about 5 to 20 percent of the concentration of ozone in urban areas. At lower temperatures, it is stable and can be transported over long distances, providing nitrogen oxides to otherwise unpolluted areas. At higher temperatures, it decomposes into NO2 and the peroxyacetyl radical. 

The decay of PAN in the atmosphere is mainly thermal. Thus, the long-range transport occurs through cold regions of the atmosphere, whereas the decomposition takes place at warmer levels. PAN can also be photolysed by UV radiation. It is a reservoir gas that serves both as a source and a sink of ROx- and NOx radicals. Nitrogen oxides from PAN decomposition enhance ozone production in the lower troposphere.

The natural concentration of PAN in the atmosphere is below 0,1 µg/m³. Measurements in German cities showed values up to 25 µg/m³. Peak values above 200 µg/m³ have been measured in Los Angeles in the second half of the 20th century (1 ppm of PAN corresponds to 4370 µg/m³). Due to the complexity of the measurement setup, only sporadic measurements are available.

PAN is a greenhouse gas.

Synthesis 
PAN can be produced in a lipophilic solvent from peroxyacetic acid. For the synthesis, concentrated sulfuric acid is added to degassed n-tridecane and peroxyacetic acid in an ice bath. Next, concentrated nitric acid is added.

As an alternative, PAN can also be synthesized in the gas phase via photolysis of acetone and NO2 with a mercury lamp. Methyl nitrate (CH3ONO2) is created as a by-product.

Toxicity 
The toxicity of PAN is higher than that of ozone. Eye irritations from photochemical smog are caused more by PAN and other trace gases than by ozone, which is only sparingly soluble. PAN is potentially involved in the creation of skin cancer. Especially chlorine-containing derivatives are considered mutagen.

References

Organic peroxides
Nitrate esters
Organic peroxide explosives
Explosive chemicals